Jack Clarke (born 1 March 1988 in Effingham, Surrey) is a professional race car driver. Clarke is the stepson of ex-Formula One and British Touring Car Championship driver Julian Bailey.

Career

Formula BMW
Clarke made his circuit racing debut in 2006 in the one-make Formula BMW UK series, driving for Nexa Racing. It was a tough rookie season, as he only scored two points all season en route to 22nd place in the championship, and sixth place in the Rookie Cup. He also finished 25th in the end of season World Final in Valencia. During the season, he achieved his A levels at the City of London Freemen's School in Ashtead, Surrey.

Formula Palmer Audi
Clarke moved up to the Formula Palmer Audi series for the 2007 season. Clarke suffered a poor start to the championship, amassing 76 points from the first seven races. Seven podiums in the last thirteen races, including two wins at Brands Hatch and Croft, progressed Clarke up the championship table to fourth, holding off Jason Moore by two points. Clarke also committed to an Autumn Trophy campaign, and he ended up third in the championship, sixteen points behind champion Richard Keen.

Clarke continued in the series in 2008, and this time finished fifth in the championship. Clarke won races at Oulton Park and Brands Hatch (both races with fastest laps) and also set a fastest lap during one of the races at Snetterton. A second Autumn Trophy campaign followed, and Clarke finished fourth, with a win, two poles and a fastest lap, all coming at Brands Hatch.

Formula Two
2009 saw Clarke move up to the FIA Formula Two Championship, driving car number eleven.

Clarke was involved in a racing accident during the second race of the Brands Hatch weekend. On lap nine, Clarke lost control of his car on the exit of Westfield bend, spinning into the tyre wall. Upon impact, one of the wheels detached from the car and bounced back towards the circuit. Pietro Gandolfi and Jolyon Palmer both avoided the tyre, but the tyre impacted with the head of Henry Surtees. His car, with its now unconscious driver, continued straight ahead into the barrier on the approach to Sheene Curve, also losing a wheel, and came to rest at the end of the curve with its remaining rear wheel still spinning. Surtees later succumbed to injuries inflicted by the tyre. Clarke paid tribute to Surtees, describing him as a "quality driver" and a "hard racer".

He scored six points over the course of the season, finishing eighteenth in the championship.

In 2010, Clarke continued in Formula Two. He scored 81 points over the season, achieving two podiums and finishing 9th. He remained in the championship for 2011.

NASCAR/ARCA
In 2012, Clarke competed in one NASCAR K&N Pro Series East event at Rockingham Speedway driving the No. 14 Toyota for the brazilian-owned: X Team Racing. He started 14th and finished 19th.

Also in 2012, Clarke competed in one NASCAR K&N Pro Series West race at NAPA Speedway driving No. 74 Dodge for Andy Woolgar. He started 17th and finished 20th. He also attempted the following event in West Series at All American Speedway but he failed to qualify for the race.

Clarke also competed in one ARCA Racing Series' race in 2012 season driving No. 97 Dodge for Creation-Cope Racing at Salem Speedway. He started 22nd and finished 30th due to a crash.

British Touring Car Championship

In 2014, Clarke entered the BTCC with Crabbie's Racing in a Ford Focus. His best result was 2nd at the Brands Hatch final.

He retired from racing at the end of that season and set up driver management company Veloce Sport with another former racing driver Rupert Svendsen-Cook, and his step-sister Mariella Bailey.

Racing record

Career summary

† As Clarke was a guest driver, he was ineligible to score points.

Complete Formula Two results
(key) (Races in bold indicate pole position) (Races in italics indicate fastest lap)

Complete British Touring Car Championship results
(key) Races in bold indicate pole position (1 point awarded – just in first race) Races in italics indicate fastest lap (1 point awarded) * signifies that driver lead race for at least one lap (1 point awarded)

References

External links

1988 births
Living people
English racing drivers
FIA Formula Two Championship drivers
Formula Palmer Audi drivers
Formula BMW UK drivers
People educated at City of London Freemen's School
Blancpain Endurance Series drivers
International GT Open drivers
24 Hours of Spa drivers
British Touring Car Championship drivers
Porsche Carrera Cup GB drivers
NASCAR drivers
ARCA Menards Series drivers
Ginetta GT4 Supercup drivers
Fluid Motorsport Development drivers
Ombra Racing drivers
Boutsen Ginion Racing drivers